

X-1A pilots

X-1A flights

See also
 Bell X-1
 Chuck Yeager
 Joseph Walker

Flight lists